Bohas-Meyriat-Rignat is a commune in the Ain department in eastern France.

History
The commune was created in January 1974 as a grouping of the three villages Bohas, Meyriat, and Rignat.

Population

See also
Communes of the Ain department

References

Communes of Ain
Ain communes articles needing translation from French Wikipedia